Parihar-SK Assembly constituency is an assembly constituency in Sitamarhi district in the Indian state of Bihar.

Overview
As per Delimitation of Parliamentary and Assembly constituencies Order, 2008, 25. Parihar Assembly constituency is composed of the following: Parihar community development block; Sonbarsa, Purandaha Rajwara Paschimi, Purandaha Rajwara Purvi, Indarwa, Pipra Parsain, Jainagar, Madhiya, Singhwahini, Bhaluaha, Bishunpur Aadhar and Dostia gram panchayats of Sonbarsha CD Block.

Parihar Assembly constituency is part of 5. Sitamarhi (Lok Sabha constituency).

Members of Vidhan Sabha

2020

References

External links
 

Assembly constituencies of Bihar
Politics of Sitamarhi district